Thomas Jefferson Word (February 6, 1805May 25, 1890) was a U.S. Representative from Mississippi.

Born in Surry County, North Carolina, Word studied law, passed his bar exam, and established a private practice. He served as member of the North Carolina House of Commons in 1832. He later moved to Mississippi and settled in Pontotoc, where he became active in state and local politics.

Word successfully contested the election of Samuel J. Gholson to the 25th Congress, and the election was set aside by the House of Representatives. Word was subsequently elected as a Whig to fill the vacancy caused by this action (May 29, 1838 – March 3, 1839). He was not reelected and retired from national politics to resume his legal practice.

In 1854, he moved to Anderson County, Texas.

He was a great-great-granduncle of writer William Faulkner.

References

Notes 

1805 births
1890 deaths
People from Surry County, North Carolina
Mississippi Whigs
North Carolina lawyers
Members of the United States House of Representatives from Mississippi
People from Pontotoc, Mississippi
People from Anderson County, Texas
North Carolina Whigs
Whig Party members of the United States House of Representatives
19th-century American politicians
19th-century American lawyers